Cephalostemon is a group of plants in the family Rapateaceae described as a genus in 1845.

The genus is native to South America.

 Species
 Cephalostemon affinis Körn - Amazonas, Tafelberg, Pará
 Cephalostemon angustatus Malme - Mato Grosso do Sul
 Cephalostemon gracilis (Poepp. & Endl.) R.H.Schomb. - Pará
 Cephalostemon microglochin Sandwith - Amazonas, Mato Grosso do Sul, Santa Cruz
 Cephalostemon riedelianus Körn - Minas Gerais, Goiás

References

Poales genera
Rapateaceae